Alan Thomas Howarth, Baron Howarth of Newport, CBE, PC, (born 11 June 1944) is a British Labour Party politician, who was a Member of Parliament (MP) from 1983 until 2005. First elected as a Conservative, he is one of few politicians in recent years to have served as a minister in both Labour and Conservative governments. He currently sits in the House of Lords as a Labour life peer.

Early life

He is the son of Major Thomas Howarth MC (Chief Master of King Edward's School, Birmingham, Second Master of Winchester College and High Master of St. Paul's School) and Margaret Teakle (who was a Wren in the Second World War). He was educated at Rugby School and gained a BA in History from King's College, Cambridge in 1965.

Howarth subsequently worked in the Conservative Party Chairman's office in Conservative Central Office under Willie Whitelaw and Peter Thorneycroft, before becoming director of the Conservative Research Department and party vice-chairman.

Parliamentary career
Having been appointed a Commander of the Order of the British Empire (CBE) in the 1982 New Year Honours for political service, Howarth was Conservative Party MP for Stratford-on-Avon, first elected in 1983. He was a founder member of the Thatcherite No Turning Back group. He served as a whip, and was subsequently Parliamentary Under-Secretary of State for Education and Science from 1989 to 1992, becoming the architect of the polytechnics' transition to university status.

Defection
On Saturday 7 October 1995, he announced his resignation from the Conservative Party and defected to the Labour Party, the first MP to defect directly from the Conservatives to Labour, and the first former Conservative MP to sit as a Labour MP since Sir Oswald Mosley. He wanted a new seat to contest as a Labour candidate and, after failing to win the seats of Wentworth and Wythenshawe and Sale East, he was selected for the safe Labour seat of Newport East in Wales. The National Union of Mineworkers leader Arthur Scargill stood against him under the Socialist Labour Party banner, but he easily held the seat for Labour.

After the election victory of 1997, he was appointed Parliamentary Under-Secretary of State for Education and Employment, becoming Minister for the Arts at the Department of Culture, Media and Sport the following year. He is also a member of the Privy Council. He was dropped from the government after the 2001 general election, and stood down from the House of Commons at the 2005 general election. Jessica Morden was selected to replace him as candidate by the Constituency Labour Party. By the time he stood down, he had spent only 18 months of his 22-year career as an MP on the opposition benches (October 1995 to May 1997).

On 15 June 2005, he was created a life peer as Baron Howarth of Newport, of Newport in the County of Gwent. In a House of Lords debate on the outcome of the European Union Referendum on 5 July 2016, Lord Howarth announced his support for Britain's departure from the European Union.

Personal life
Howarth married Gillian Chance in 1967.  They have two daughters (born 1974 and 1975) and two sons (born 1977 and April 1985). They divorced in 1996.   He was later the partner of Labour peer Patricia Hollis who died in 2018.

References

External links 
 They Work For You

News items
 Richard Branson in October 2000
 Selling burgers in Royal Parks in May 2000

Labour Party (UK) MPs for English constituencies
Politics of Newport, Wales
Welsh Labour Party MPs
Conservative Party (UK) MPs for English constituencies
Members of the Privy Council of the United Kingdom
1944 births
Living people
People educated at Rugby School
Alumni of King's College, Cambridge
Howarth of Newport
Commanders of the Order of the British Empire
UK MPs 1983–1987
UK MPs 1987–1992
UK MPs 1992–1997
UK MPs 1997–2001
UK MPs 2001–2005
Life peers created by Elizabeth II